Diving salvage warfare specialist is a  United States Navy special warfare rating.

The diving salvage warfare specialist program is for active and reserve fleet diving communities. The program designation signifies a United States Navy diver has excelled in competency and professionalism, and formally recognizes initiative, technical competence, and readiness for increased responsibility.

References

See also
List of United States Navy ratings

United States Navy ratings